The following is a list of venues that have hosted matches as part of the Rugby League World Cup.

The first Rugby league World Cup was staged in France in 1954 with the last having been staged in England in 2022. The next World Cup is set to be held in France in 2025

As of 2022, there have been 16 Rugby League World Cups held since the inaugural event in 1954.

Venues by tournament
All countries listed in alphabetical order while all venues listed in order of appearance and with their non-corporate name (unless unavoidable). Venue capacity is as it currently stands and in some cases may vary from the capacity of the venue at the time of use. For example, the Sydney Cricket Ground's current spectator capacity is 48,000 but stood at 70,000 when used as a World Cup venue from 1957 to 1977.

Stadiums in bold text show Rugby League World Cup Final hosts.
Stadiums in italic text show ground has been demolished as of 2017.

France 1954

Australia 1957

England 1960

Australia and New Zealand 1968

England 1970

France 1972

International 1975

Australia/New Zealand 1977

International 1985–1988

International 1989–1992

England 1995

United Kingdom 2000

Australia 2008

England and Wales 2013

Although the competition was officially co hosted by England and Wales, France and Ireland played games in their respected home nations.

Australia, New Zealand and Papua New Guinea 2017

England 2021

Venues by nation

Australia

England

* 1975 had no official World Cup Final. Instead a special challenge match was played.

France

Ireland

New Zealand

Northern Ireland

Papua New Guinea

Scotland

Wales

See also

 Rugby League World Cup finals
 List of rugby league competitions
 List of rugby league stadiums by capacity

References

Further reading

External links

 Official Rugby League World Cup Website
 Rugby League International Federation

Rugby league-related lists